Jens Vilhelm Pedersen, also known as Fuzzy, (23 February 1939 – 13 October 2022) was a Danish composer and musician. A student of Per Nørgård, Karlheinz Stockhausen, György Ligeti, and Jan Bark, he taught music history and theory at the Royal Academy of Music in Aarhus until 1978.

His music spanned a wide range of genres from jazz, over film music, to experimental electronic music.

In 1972, he composed the music for the Rainer Werner Fassbinder TV series Eight Hours Don't Make a Day under the pseudonym Jean Gepoint.

Fuzzy died on 13 October 2022, at the age of 83.

References

External links
 Fuzzy biography from Naxos
  (in Danish) including CV in English
  as Fuzzy
  as Jens Wilhelm Pedersen
 

1939 births
2022 deaths
Danish composers
Male composers
Danish jazz musicians
People from Roskilde